Untertal may refer to:

Rohrmoos-Untertal, a municipality in the district of Liezen in Styria, Austria
Untertal, Glarus, a hamlet near the village of Elm in the canton of Glarus, Switzerland